is a  funicular railway station located in the city of Ōtsu, Shiga Prefecture, Japan, operated by the private railway company Hieizan Railway.

Lines

Station layout
The station consists of a single bay platform, and when it is  crowded, the doors on both sides of the train may be opened to drop passengers. The station building was built in 1925 and is a two-story Western-style structure with a ticket office, a waiting room, operator room, and a crew waiting room on the first floor. There used to be a guest room on the second floor, but now it is open to the public as a gallery, and observation terrace. The station building received protection by the national government as a Registered Tangible Cultural Property in 2017.

Adjacent stations

History
Operation were suspended from March 19, 1945 to Augusts 7, 1946. The station was renamed January 15, 1974.

Surrounding area
Enryaku-ji
Mount Hiei

See also
List of railway stations in Japan

References

External links

Sakamoto Cable official home page

Railway stations in Shiga Prefecture
Railway stations in Japan opened in 1927
Railway stations in Ōtsu
Registered Tangible Cultural Properties